Inverkeilor railway station served the village of Inverkeilor, Angus, Scotland from 1883 to 1930 on the North British, Arbroath and Montrose Railway.

History 
The station was opened as Inverkeillor on 1 May 1883 by the North British, Arbroath and Montrose Railway. The line had opened for goods on 1 March but required a bridge to be rebuilt before it could be used for passenger trains. By 1896 the station had become Inverkeilor.

To the northwest was the goods yard.

The station closed to both passengers and goods traffic on 22 September 1930.

Despite being closed the station was host to a LNER camping coach from 1936 to 1939. Campers were advised to take the bus from either Arbroath or Montrose.

References

External links 

Disused railway stations in Angus, Scotland
Former North British Railway stations
Railway stations in Great Britain opened in 1883
Railway stations in Great Britain closed in 1930
1883 establishments in Scotland
1930 disestablishments in Scotland